Public Enemy is a 2002 South Korean action film directed by Kang Woo-suk. The film was well received by audiences and critics alike, being seen by almost 3 million people in South Korea, while winning Sol Kyung-gu Best Actor at the Grand Bell Awards and Blue Dragon Film Awards for his lead role. The success of the film led to the making of the sequel Another Public Enemy in 2005.

Plot 
The film's plot pits a tough loose-cannon cop, Kang Chul-joong, and a psychopathic killer, Cho Kyu-hwan, against each other. Kang typifies the anti-hero cop genre, taking bribes and stealing drugs from criminals. His career is in a slump and internal affairs are investigating his actions. The antagonist Cho, on the other hand, leads a life as a successful business and family man. Under his cool exterior however, he displays a total disregard for others, killing people for the slightest perceived misdeed.

The two main characters first meet by chance in a dark alley shortly after Cho brutally murders his parents for monetary reasons. Cho first asked then started begging to get his parents to leave their will to him. After his parents refuse, Cho gets a knife and stabs them both dozens of times. He sprays flour all around their body and washes the excess blood by taking a shower. Then he starts walking to get rid of the murder weapon. Kang is defecating in the dark alley during an unrelated stakeout and runs into Cho, who ends up slashing Kang in the face with a knife.

Kang later joins the investigation into the murders, but doesn't recognize Cho as he didn't get a good look at his face. His instincts tell him that something is wrong about Cho, and Kang starts stalking him.  Kang soon convinces himself that Cho is the murderer, although no one else believes that he has a case.  He is eventually fired from the police force and becomes a traffic cop.

Eventually, Kang discovers a crucial piece of evidence, a broken fingernail, at the murder scene and confronts Cho with it. This leads to the two facing off against each other in a fight, which ends with Kang beating Cho to death.  Kang is restored to the force, and at the end his internal affairs tail reports that he "is getting better."

Cast
 Sol Kyung-gu ... Kang Chul-joong
 Lee Sung-jae ... Cho Kyu-hwan
 Kang Shin-il ... Chief Investigator Uhm
 Kim Jeong-hak ... Detective Kim
 Do Yong-gu ... Detective Nam

Awards and nominations
2002 Chunsa Film Art Awards
 Best Supporting Actor - Kang Shin-il

2002 Baeksang Arts Awards
 Jury Prize

2002 Grand Bell Awards
 Best Actor - Sol Kyung-gu

2002 Blue Dragon Film Awards
 Best Actor - Sol Kyung-gu

References

External links 
 
 
 
 Public Enemy review at Koreanfilm.org

2002 films
2000s Korean-language films
2000s crime action films
Police detective films
South Korean crime action films
Films directed by Kang Woo-suk
2000s South Korean films